XHOPE-FM 89.7 is a radio station in Mazatlán, Sinaloa. It carries the national Exa FM format from MVS Radio.

History
XEOPE received its first concession in March 1945. Then known as XETK-AM, it broadcast on 630 kHz with 1,000 watts day and 250 watts night (later increased to 500).

In 1972, Oscar Pérez Escobosa bought XETK along with XESA-AM in Culiacán. He already owned XERJ-AM in Mazatlán, which had begun operations in 1940, and he also founded XHMZ-TV channel 7. Pérez founded Grupo Promomedios, which continues to own the rechristened XEOPE/XHOPE (named in his honor) as well as the FM successors to those stations.

Promomedios presented the IFT with a surrender of the 630 AM frequency on July 3, 2019.

References

Radio stations in Sinaloa
Radio stations established in 1945